Naradasu Laxman Rao is an Indian politician and a Member of Legislative Council in Telangana. He belongs to Telangana Rashtra Samithi. He is an MLC from Karimnagar. He produced one film which won Nandi Award for Best Film on National Integration - Vimukti Kosam (1983)

References

Telangana Rashtra Samithi politicians
Living people
1955 births